Clyde Thomas Davenport (October 21, 1921 – February 16, 2020) was an American old-time fiddler and banjo player from Monticello, Kentucky.

Davenport was a recipient of a 1992 National Heritage Fellowship awarded by the National Endowment for the Arts, which is the United States government's highest honor in the folk and traditional arts. He died in February 2020 at the age of 98.

References

External links
 
 

1921 births
2020 deaths
American banjoists
Appalachian old-time fiddlers
Country musicians from Kentucky
Folk musicians from Kentucky
National Heritage Fellowship winners
People from Monticello, Kentucky